Oddi is an Italian surname. Notable people with the name include:
Oddi Helgason (c.1070/80 – c. 1140/50), Icelandic farm laborer and astronomer 
Angelo Oddi, Canadian songwriter and composer
Ettore Arrigoni degli Oddi,(1867–1942), Italian Count and ornithologist
Emidio Oddi, Italian footballer
Giacomo Oddi (1679-1770), Italian archbishop and cardinal
Giuseppe Oddi (1839-1919), Blessed, Italian Roman Catholic Franciscan religious
Mauro Oddi (1639-c. 1702), Italian painter
Muzio Oddi (1569–1639), Italian mathematician and Gnomonist
Ruggero Oddi,  Italian physiologist
Silvio Oddi, Italian cardinal and diplomat
Gian Oddi, Italian-Brazilian journalist and soccer commentator

See also
Oddie (surname)
Oddy (surname)

Italian-language surnames